The Copa de los Campeones de España was a Spanish football competition, held once in September 1940 as a two-legged game between Club Atlético-Aviación (1939–40 La Liga winners) and RCD Español de Barcelona (1940 Copa del Generalísimo winners).

The first leg on 1 September was a 3–3 draw at the Sarrià Stadium in Barcelona, while the second two weeks later at the Campo de Fútbol de Vallecas was a 7–1 victory for Atlético, who were tenants at the ground following the destruction of their stadium in the Spanish Civil War.

It was the first super cup in Spanish football. The tournament was not repeated, but the format resumed in 1945 with the Copa de Oro Argentina, and two years later there was the first official version, the Copa Eva Duarte. This ended in 1953 and the current Supercopa de España began in 1982.

Matches

References

Defunct football cup competitions in Spain
Defunct national association football supercups
1940–41 in Spanish football
Atlético Madrid matches
RCD Espanyol matches
History of football in Spain